Semper fidelis is a Latin phrase that means "always faithful" – it serves globally as a common motto for several military units.

Semper fidelis may also refer to:

 Semper Fidelis (march), John Philip Sousa march
 Semper Fidelis (album), album by German black metal band Nargaroth
 Semper Fidelis, first mission in the first-person shooter video game Battlefield 3
 Semper Fidelis Marine Corps, rename of computer game Söldner: Secret Wars

Television
 Semper Fidelis (NCIS), 2008 season 6 television episode
 Semper Fidelis (Jericho episode), 2007 season 1 television episode
 "Semper Fidelis", 1989 season 4 Growing Pains episode
 "Semper Fidelis", 1979 season 4 Quincy, M.E. episode
 "Semper Fidelis", 1959 season 1 New York Confidential episode
 "Semper Fidelis", 2016 season 2 Daredevil (TV series) episode

See also
Semper fi (disambiguation)